is a railway station in Sasebo, Nagasaki, Japan. It is operated by Matsuura Railway and is located on the Nishi-Kyūshū Line.

The distance to Sasebo-Chūō Station is only 200 m.

Lines
The station is served by the Nishi-Kyūshū Line.

Station layout
The station is elevated with a single side platform.

Environs
Yonkachō Shōtengai
Sasebo Tamaya
Sankachō Shōtengai
Sasebo City Library
Sasebo city museum Shimanose art center
Sasebo Post Office

History
July 15, 1961 - Opens for business.
April 1, 1987 - Railways privatize and this station is inherited by JR Kyushu. 
April 1, 1988 - This station is inherited by Matsuura Railway.

Adjacent stations 

|-
|colspan=5 style="text-align:center;" |Matsuura Railway

References
Nagasaki statistical yearbook (Nagasaki prefectural office statistics section) (Japanese)

External links

Matsuura Railway (Japanese)

Railway stations in Japan opened in 1961
Railway stations in Nagasaki Prefecture
Sasebo